Panguang Road is a station on Line 7 of the Shanghai Metro. It opened on June 30, 2011, half a year later than the opening of the phase 2 northern extension of the line.

The station is located near the intersection of Luxiang Road and Panguang Road in Gucun Town, Baoshan District.

References 
(Chinese) 潘广路站建设用地规划许可证

Railway stations in Shanghai
Shanghai Metro stations in Baoshan District
Railway stations in China opened in 2011
Line 7, Shanghai Metro